Anthony Barnett (born 11 June 1952) is an Australian basketball player. He competed in the men's tournament at the 1976 Summer Olympics.

References

1952 births
Living people
Australian men's basketball players
Olympic basketball players of Australia
Basketball players at the 1976 Summer Olympics
Place of birth missing (living people)